In Your House 12: It's Time was the 12th In Your House professional wrestling pay-per-view (PPV) event produced by the World Wrestling Federation (WWF, now WWE) and presented by Milton Bradley's Karate Fighters. It took place on December 15, 1996, at the West Palm Beach Auditorium in West Palm Beach, Florida. The name of the show was taken from Vader's catchphrase and indicated that he was originally scheduled to have a high profile match on the show, but due to injuries, he was absent from the event.

The main event of the show was the first championship defense of newly crowned WWF Champion Sycho Sid, defending against former multi-time champion Bret Hart. The show featured five matches on the PPV portion, one match on the Free for All pre-show, and two dark matches. With the launch of the WWE Network in 2014, this show became available on demand, but it did not include the Free for All pre-show match.

This event featured technical broadcast difficulties during the show and those who ordered the event on DirecTV, Request TV and Viewer's Choice were allowed to watch the broadcast again days later.

Production

Background
In Your House was a series of monthly pay-per-view (PPV) shows first produced by the World Wrestling Federation (WWF, now WWE) in May 1995. They aired when the promotion was not holding one of its then-five major PPVs (WrestleMania, King of the Ring, SummerSlam, Survivor Series, and Royal Rumble), and were sold at a lower cost. In Your House 12: It's Time took place on December 15, 1996, at the West Palm Beach Auditorium in West Palm Beach, Florida. The name of the show was taken from Vader's catchphrase and indicated that he was originally scheduled to have a high profile match on the show, but due to injuries, he was absent from the event.

Storylines
In Your House 12: It's Time featured professional wrestling matches involving different wrestlers from pre-existing scripted feuds, plots, and storylines that were played out on Monday Night Raw and the World Wrestling Federation's (WWF) other television programs. Wrestlers portrayed a heel (wrestling term for those that portray the "bad guys") or a face (those who portray the "good guy") as they followed a series of events that built tension, and culminated into a wrestling match or series of matches.

Event

During the WWF Tag Team Championship between champions Owen Hart and The British Bulldog (c) and the team of Razor Ramon and Diesel masked Mexican Lucha libre luchadors Pierroth and Cibernético appeared at ringside, representing AAA. They appeared briefly to signal the working relationship between the WWF and AAA. Before the match Stone Cold Steve Austin showed up and attacked the British Bulldog until WWF officials separate the two. After Hart and Bulldog separated the two Austin reappeared, clipped Bulldog's leg from behind and then ran off.

The Undertaker faced off against The Executioner in a Texas Deathmatch, which for this event was renamed an "Armageddon Rules" match. This match is a variant of a Last Man Standing match- a match where if a wrestler does not get up to his feet after a 10-count (like a boxing match), he loses. But in a Texas Deathmatch, in order for the referee to start a 10-count on a downed wrestler, that downed wrestler first has to be pinned to a standard 3-count by his opponent. During the match the Undertaker's long time rival Mankind came to the ring and attacked the Undertaker. While fighting the Undertaker threw Mankind through the fake house decorations by the entrance before returning to the ring. Afterwards Mankind was put in a straitjacket and dragged from the ring by security. In the end the Undertaker won when he pinned the Executioner, and then the Executioner was unable to get back to his feet after the post-3-count pin 10-count.

During the main event Shawn Michaels provided guest commentary during the match between Sycho Sid and Bret Hart. At one point Stone Cold Steve Austin ran to the ring and attacked Bret Hart, causing both Owen Hart and the British Bulldog to come to Bret's aid. The match was halted while Austin, Owen Hart and the Bulldog were ejected from the arena. During the match Hart and Michaels exchanged words, which drew Shawn Michaels away from the commentators' desk and up on the ring apron. Moments later Bret Hart collided with Michaels, allowing Sid to win the match. Following the match, Hart attacked Shawn Michaels in anger.

Results

References

12: It's Time
Professional wrestling shows in Florida
1996 in Florida
1996 WWF pay-per-view events
December 1996 events in the United States
West Palm Beach, Florida